Richard Simonsen (born 20 August 1945) is a former Norwegian sprinter who specialized in the 200 and 400 metres.

He finished eighth in 4 × 400 metres relay at the 1971 European Championships with his teammates Steinar Mo, Gøte Lundblad and Per Rom. He also participated at the 1969 European Championships, but never at the Summer Olympics. He became Norwegian champion in 200 m in 1967, 1970 and 1971 and in 400 m in the years 1967–1970.

References

1945 births
Living people
Norwegian male sprinters
People educated at The Portsmouth Grammar School